The Federal Correctional Institution, Mendota (FCI Mendota) is a medium-security United States federal prison for male inmates in California. It is operated by the Federal Bureau of Prisons, a division of the United States Department of Justice. The facility also has an adjacent satellite prison camp housing minimum-security male offenders.

FCI Mendota is located in central California, 36 miles west of Fresno.

History
FCI Mendota opened in January 2012 after years of funding delays. The final cost of construction was $235 million. Mendota Mayor Robert Silva was pleased about the new jobs and revenue for local businesses that the prison would provide and encouraged the Bureau of Prisons to hire as many local residents as it could.

Facility and inmate life 
FCI Mendota is located on 960 acres and is enclosed with a 12-foot-high razor wire fence. Inside the facility, inmates have access to educational programs where they may work toward their GED certificate and gain vocational training.  Prisoners are required to work on a number of duties, ranging from food preparation in the dining hall to maintenance work. A recreation yard has basketball courts, a soccer field and a track.

Inmates sleep in seven- by twelve-foot cells, complete with toilet and sink. They have access to a common area where they can exercise, shower, and watch basic cable television.

Official counts are conducted at 12:05 a.m., 3 a.m., 5 a.m., 4 p.m. and 10 p.m. The 4 p.m. and 10 p.m. counts are known as "standing counts," during which inmates must stop what they are doing and stand up even if they are in bed. An additional standing count is held at 10 a.m. on holidays and weekends.

Notable inmates

See also
 List of U.S. federal prisons
 Federal Bureau of Prisons
 Incarceration in the United States

References 

2012 establishments in California
Buildings and structures in Fresno County, California
Prisons in California
Mendota